Little Miss Thoroughbred is a 1938 film directed by John Farrow. Peggy Ann Garner made her debut in the film. It was also known as Little Lady Luck.

Plot
Knowing her father's out there somewhere, little Janet runs away from an orphanage. A couple of gamblers, Nails Morgan and Todd Harrington, are running late to get a wager down, but Nails lies to a cop, O'Reilly, pretending the little girl is his daughter; Janet plays along.

Madge Perry is charmed by her sweetheart Nails's new "child." The superstitious Nails wins at a dice game with the little girl nearby, so Madge convinces him that Janet is good luck. Madge picks a sure thing at the racetrack, having gotten a tip, but pretends it was Janet who suggested betting on the horse.

O'Reilly brings his own daughter by for a visit. Discovering what is going on, he says Janet can only stay if Nails and Madge immediately get married. They do, but after Janet's photo runs in the newspaper, the orphanage feels being around gamblers is bad for the child and asks to regain custody. Nails wins in court, but only by vowing to find a proper job.

Cast
 John Litel as Nails
 Ann Sheridan as Madge
 Janet Chapman as Janet
 Frank McHugh as Harrington
 Robert Homans as O'Reilly

Production
The film was announced in January 1938 as Little Lady Luck. It was inspired by the success of Little Miss Marker (1934). George Bricker and Albert Demond worked on the story and John Farrow was announced as director. Warners said instead of using established child actors they look for talent from orphanages. Lead roles were given to Ann Sheridan and John Litel.

Four year old Janet Chapman was cast in the lead. Peggy Moran was signed. Filming began late January 1938. Chapman was signed to a seven-year contract. In March the title was changed to Little Miss Thoroughbred.

The film marked the debut of Peggy Ann Garner.

References

External links
 Little Miss Thoroughbred at IMDb
 
 
 

1938 romantic drama films
1938 films
Films directed by John Farrow